Henry R. Kahane (* 2. November 1902 in Berlin; † 11. September 1992 in Urbana (Illinois)) was a Romance philologist and linguist. His father was the Berlin literary figure, Arthur Kahane, a close collaborator of Max Reinhardt. In 1931 he married Renée Toole, who he met when they were both PhD students in Berlin. She became his lifelong intellectual partner.

Career
Kahane studied Romance philology in Germany under Ernst Gamillscheg (18801962) and Gerhard Rohlfs (18921986), receiving his PhD in 1930 under the supervision of Gamillscheg.

After obtaining their PhDs, Henry and Renée Kahane moved to Florence and spent several years collecting a large corpus of Venetian loanwords used in Greek dialects. Henry Kahane also served as a teacher and later principal of a school for the children of German refugees in Florence. Following Henry's brief imprisonment in Florence by Mussolini as part of a general round up of immigrant Jews, the Kahanes moved to Cephalonia, Greece, Renée Kahane's birthplace. They managed to emigrate to the US in 1939. From 1939 to 1941 Henry Kahane worked as a research assistant in comparative literature at the University of Southern California, Los Angeles. In 1941 he took up a position at the University of Illinois in the department of Spanish, Italian, and Portuguese. In 1965 he founded the Department of Linguistics at the University of Illinois and became the department's first head, a position he held until his retirement in 1971. A Festschrift in honor of Henry R. and Renée Kahane was published by the University of Illinois Press in 1973.

Henry and Renée Kahane are estimated to have had a scholarly output of at least a dozen books and well over one hundred and fifty other publications dealing with various aspects of literary history and linguistics, such as etymology, Romance and Mediterranean lexicography, stylistics, morphology, and dialectology. Beginning in the 1960s their particular focus became the investigation and recovery of the Hellenic heritage to the West, including a sociolinguistic study of the relations between Byzantium and the West told through the reciprocal borrowings of words.

Honors 
Henry Kahane was awarded Guggenheim Fellowships in 1955 and in 1962.

Henry Kahane served as President of the Linguistic Society of America in 1984.

Henry and Renee Kahane were awarded Bicentennial Gold Medals by the Georgetown University Linguistics Department in 1989 in recognition of their lifelong contributions to the field of Romance linguistics.

Selected works

Kahane, Henry R.; Kahane, Renée. Animalia Pyrricha. Göttingen: Vandenhoeck et Ruprecht, 1960.
Kahane, Henry R.; Kahane, Renée. Magic and Gnosticism in the "Chanson de Roland". Oakland, CA: University of California Press, 1959.
Kahane, Henry R.; Kahane, Renée. Mediterranean Words. 1952.
Kahane, Henry R.; Kahane, Renée. The System of the Verb in the Western Languages. Tübingen: Max Niemeyer, 1957.
Sánchez Ruipérez, Martin.; Kahane, Henry R. (review). Estructura del sistema de aspectos y tiempos del verbo griego antiguo: análisis funcional sincrónico. Salamanca: Colegio Trilingüe de la Universidad, 1954.
Kahane, Henry R. Principles of Comparative Syntax. Louvain: International Agency for Dialectology General, 1954.
Kahane, Henry R.; Beym, Richard. Syntactical juncture in colloquial Mexican Spanish. Language, Volume 24, Number 4, pp. 388396. United States: Linguistic Society of America, 1948.
Kahane, Henry R.; Kahane, Renée. The Augmentative Feminine in the Romance Languages. Oakland, CA: University of California Press, 1949.
Kahane, Henry R.; Kahane, Renée. The Mediterranean Term Surgere "to Anchor". Oakland, CA: University of California Press, 1951.
Kahane, Henry R.; Kahane, Renée. The Position of the Actor Expression in Colloquial Mexican Spanish. 1950.
Kahane, Henry R. The Verbal Categories of Colloquial Brazilian Portuguese. United States: University of Illinois, 1953.
Kahane, Henry R.; Saporta, Sol. The Verbal Categories of Judeo-Spanish, Parts 12. Hispanic Review. United States: University of Pennsylvania, 1953.

Further reading
Kachru, Braj B. Henry Kahane. Language, Volume 81, Number 1, March 2005, pp. 237244. United States: Linguistic Society of America.

References 

1902 births
1992 deaths
American Hispanists
Linguists from the United States
Romance philologists
Linguistic Society of America presidents
20th-century linguists